MSC Orchestra is a cruise ship that was built in 2007 for MSC Cruises. She is the second ship of the Musica class. She could at the time accommodate 2,550 passengers in 1,275 cabins. Most inside cabins were later refitted with two bunk beds and therefore she can now accommodate 3,200 passengers. Her crew complement is approximately 990.

Design
The ship has capacity for 2,550 passengers and a crew complement of 987.

Incidents 

Eight passengers, four Bulgarians and four Lithuanians, were arrested during 2010 after cocaine, worth an estimated £1.4m, was found on board whilst berthed at Dover, United Kingdom. Seven of the passengers pleaded guilty and the eighth was convicted at trial.

Both ships only sustained minor damage and were cleared to depart.

See also 
 List of cruise ships

References

Notes

Bibliography

External links

Official Website

Orchestra
Ships built in France
2006 ships